Anjunabeats Volume 10 is the tenth installment in the Anjunabeats Volume compilation series mixed and compiled by British trance group Above & Beyond. It was released on 4 March 2013 by Anjunabeats.

Track listing 
The track list for the album was revealed on 30 January 2013.

Release history

References

External links 
 Anjunabeats Volume 10 holding page

2013 compilation albums
Above & Beyond (band) albums
Anjunabeats compilation albums
Sequel albums
Electronic compilation albums